Radha Charan Gupta (born 1935 in Jhansi, in present-day Uttar Pradesh) is an Indian historian of mathematics.

Early life of Radha Charan Gupta 
Gupta graduated from the University of Lucknow, where he made his bachelor's degree in 1955 and his master's degree in 1957. He earned his Ph.D. in the history of mathematics from Ranchi University in 1971. He did his dissertation work at Ranchi University with the historian of Indian mathematics T.A. Sarasvati Amma. Then he served as a lecturer at Lucknow Christian College (from 1957 to 1958) and in 1958 he joined Birla Institute of Technology, Mesra. In 1982 he was awarded a full professorship. He retired in 1995 as the Emeritus Professor of the history of mathematics and logic. He became a corresponding member of the International Academy of the History of Science in February 1995.

Works
In 1969 Gupta addressed interpolation in Indian mathematics. He wrote on Govindasvamin and his interpolation of sine tables. Furthermore, he contributed an article on the work of Paramesvara: "Paramesvara's rule for the circumradius of a cyclic quadrilateral".

Notable awards
In 1991 he was elected a Fellow of the National Academy of Sciences, India, and in 1994 he became President of the Association of Mathematics Teachers of India. In 1979 he founded the magazine Ganita Bharati.

In 2009 he was awarded the Kenneth O. May Prize alongside the British mathematician Ivor Grattan-Guinness. He is notably the first Indian to get this prize.

In 2023, he was awarded the Padma Shri by the Government of India for his contributions in the field of literature and education.

References

20th-century Indian mathematicians
Scholars from Uttar Pradesh
1935 births
20th-century Indian historians
Historians of mathematics
Living people
Ranchi University alumni
People from Jhansi
Scientists from Uttar Pradesh
Recipients of the Padma Shri in literature & education